The Ordem dos Biólogos (OdB) is a professional body for biologists, primarily those working in Portugal. The Ordem dos Biólogos is headquartered in Lisbon, and has regional branches in several other cities across Portugal. It was founded on 4 July 1998 by the Decree-Law 183/98. Any citizen with accredited degree and professional activity in biology (or other specific related fields covered by its statutes) within Portugal, is required by law to be affiliated with the Ordem dos Biólogos.

History
The Ordem dos Biólogos is the successor of the Associação Portuguesa de Biólogos (APB) founded on 20 April 1987.

Role of the Ordem dos Biólogos
As the professional body representing biologists, the Ordem dos Biólogos is frequently consulted on biological issues by the Portuguese Government, Parliament of Portugal, higher education institutions, industry and other organisations.

Membership
There are several grades of membership, depending upon biological qualifications and experience. The main requirements include high level of attainment in biological experience, personal integrity, professional attributes and academic qualifications. In addition, there are student and associate membership grades.

The Member grade is the main professional grade. Members are professional biologists with a standard of academic attainment equivalent to the bachelor's degree (Portugal's licenciatura) level in biological science and with post-graduate responsible experience in biological research or in the teaching or application of biological science. Members are entitled to use the professional title Biologist or related titles like Bioscientist or Biotechnologist.

Fellowship
Fellowship of the Ordem dos Biólogos is the senior professional grade. Bioscientists who have achieved distinction in biological research or the teaching or application of biological science are eligible.

Specialized societies
The Ordem dos Biólogos has four specialized professional biologists' societies divided in four major fields: environment, biotechnology, education, and human biology and health.

 Colégio do Ambiente
 Colégio da Biotecnologia
 Colégio da Educação
 Colégio da Biologia Humana e Saúde

The main structure also includes the Professional and Deontological Council.

Notable members 
Maria de Jesus Silva Fernandes (president), Jorge Araújo, Maria Amélia Loução

See also
Ordem dos Advogados
Ordem dos Engenheiros
Ordem dos Médicos

References

External links
 Ordem dos Biólogos
 Ordem dos Biólogos on Facebook

Biology organizations
Professional associations based in Portugal